There were elections in 1903 to the United States House of Representatives:

57th Congress 
Elections are listed by date and district.

|-
| 

|-
| 

|}

58th Congress 

Elections are listed by date and district.

|-
| 
|
|
|
| 1903 Ohio's 16th congressional district special election

|-
| 
|
|
|
| 1903 Pennsylvania's 4th congressional district special election

|-
| 
|
|
|
| 1903 Texas's 8th congressional district special election

|-
| 
|
|
|
| 

|-
| 
|
|
|
| 

|-
| 
|
|
|
|

|}

 
1903